Jasmine Cassandra Curtis-Smith (born April 6, 1994) is a Filipino-Australian actress, host, dancer, endorser, writer, and model. She is known internationally for her critically acclaimed performance in Hannah Espia's 2013 film Transit, and in the Philippines as the younger sister of fellow actress Anne Curtis.

Early life
She was born on 6 April 1994 in Melbourne, Australia as the second daughter of Carmencita Ojales, a Filipino, and James Ernest Curtis-Smith, an Australian lawyer. Aside from her older sister Anne, she also has a younger brother named Thomas James, who is currently completing secondary school in Australia, and had a half-sister named Clare on her father's side who died in 2007 at four months old due to a cardiovascular disease. During her first stay in the Philippines, she studied at St. Paul College in Pasig before leaving in 2005 to return to Australia, where she finished her elementary and secondary schooling. She graduated high school at Loyola College in Watsonia, Melbourne.

Career

2010–2012: Early television career
Curtis first came into notice during her vacations in the Philippines visiting her sister Anne, and it was not until mid-2010, when she appeared in ABS-CBN's noontime variety show Showtime, that networks began pushing to sign her. In December 2010, Curtis signed an exclusive three-year contract with TV5 and is being groomed by the network to be one of its Primetime Princesses. In an interview after the contract signing, she mentioned that she felt really happy to have finally settled in TV5 and appreciated the network's decision to allow her to balance her studies and her showbiz career. In 2013, she signed another 3-year contract with TV5.

Curtis' first miniseries for TV5 was a television remake with JC de Vera of the 1991 Philippine action-romance film Ang Utol Kong Hoodlum, which was top billed by Robin Padilla and Vina Morales. Some of the scenes in the series were shot in Curtis's native Australia. In 2012, she played the role of Epifania "Anya" Dionisio in Nandito Ako, where she co-starred with Eula Caballero as Holly Posadas and American Idol season 7 runner-up David Archuleta as Josh Bradley.

2012–2013: Early film career and critical acclaim

Curtis started her film career with two independent film productions: Puti, a 2012 psychological thriller in which she played Nika; and Transit, where she played Yael, an Israeli-Filipino child of an Overseas Filipino who faces deportation. Transit received wide critical acclaim, competing at the 18th Busan International Film Festival, receiving 10 awards at the 9th Cinemalaya Independent Film Festival, and eventually became the Philippines' entry to the 86th Academy Awards for Best Foreign Language Film. Curtis' performance as Yael, which required her to quickly learn Hebrew just before production, earned her critical praise from both local and international critics, and earned  Curtis the Best Supporting Actress award 

2013 also saw her featured on the cover of various magazines in 2013, including Candy, Mega, and with sister Anne was the cover story of the Philippines' maiden issue of ¡Hola!.

2016–2017: Recent projects

In 2016, Curtis-Smith won the best actress award at the 2016 Cinema One Originals Film Festival for playing the lead role of Alex in the LGBT-themed film Baka Bukas (lit. Maybe Tomorrow).

2017 saw Curtis-Smith co-starring in JP Habac's I'm Drunk, I Love You, an arthouse romantic comedy which quickly became a viral sensation, prompting a viral fan campaign to keep it in cinemas despite lack of studio support.  Popularly referred to as "IDILY" (an acronym based on the film's title), the film's quirky dialogue and comedic timing turned Curtis (who played the film's romantic "antagonist", Pathy) and co-stars Maja Salvador (Carson) and Paulo Avelino (Dio) into viral meme sensations.

2018–present: As a GMA Network artist
On 17 April 2018, Curtis-Smith signed an exclusive contract with GMA Network. Her first drama series in the network was Pamilya Roces. She also appeared in the Philippine adaptation of Korean drama Descendants of the Sun.

She was first paired with Alden Richards in the first installment of the romance-drama anthology I Can See You titled Love on the Balcony, and later on the drama series The World Between Us. 

She was first paired with drama series upcoming project Mechanical Heart with Derrick Monasterio

Method
Curtis-Smith describes her method for improving her acting skills as a process of “learning and observing all kinds of people.” Remarking in an interview after winning a Cinema One best actress award for "Baka Bukas" in 2016, she notes: “I watch, but don’t stare. I listen, but don’t eavesdrop. I become inspired, but don’t necessarily imitate. Although in some cases, like in real-life stories, imitation may be required.”

Advocacy and issues
Curtis-Smith has spoken out in public on a number of issues, including body positivity and rural electrification. She has invited Filipino fans to become active voters, and tweeted with dismay when the Philippine Congress almost defunded the Philippines' constitutionally mandated Commission on Human Rights in 2017.

Twinmark Media Facebook Issue 

In February 2021, investigative reporters Camille Elemia and Gelo Gonzales published a report about the social media accounts of several Philippine celebrities – including Curtis-Smith's Facebook account – being used to post propaganda and disinformation favoring the administration of president Rodrigo Duterte.

Vidanes Celebrity Marketing (VCM), Curtis-Smith's management agency at the until a few months later in April 2021, said at the time that Twinmark Media Enterprises, who was their source of the posts and websites involved, had engaged VCM in September 2016 "for social media marketing purposes to promote health-related, positive-vibe articles." VCM said that they were not aware of the content of Curtis-Smith's site, and that they ended "when the posts their talents were asked to share were no longer consistent" with their artists' images.

Filmography

Film

Television

Music video appearances

Awards and nominations

Notes

References

External links

1994 births
Living people
Actresses from Melbourne
Filipino women comedians
Filipino film actresses
Filipino child actresses
Filipino people of Australian descent
Filipino television actresses
Ateneo de Manila University alumni
Intercontinental Broadcasting Corporation personalities
TV5 (Philippine TV network) personalities
GMA Network personalities
People educated at Loyola College